Wheelchair basketball at the 1968 Summer Paralympics consisted of men's and women's team events.

The original wheelchair basketball classification system in 1966 had 5 classes: A, B, C, D, S.  Each class was worth so many points.  A was worth 1, B and C were worth 2. D and S were worth 3 points.  A team could have a maximum of 12 points on the floor.  This system was the one in place for the 1968 Summer Paralympics.  Class A was for T1-T9 complete.  Class B was for T1-T9 incomplete. Class C was for T10-L2 complete. Class D was for T10-L2 incomplete.  Class S was for Cauda equina paralysis.

Medal summary 

Source: Paralympic.org

See also
Basketball at the 1968 Summer Olympics

References 

 

1968 Summer Paralympics events
1968
1968 in basketball
International basketball competitions hosted by Israel